Klaasville is an unincorporated community in Hanover Township, Lake County, Indiana.

History
A post office was established at Klaasville in 1882, and remained in operation until it was discontinued in 1902. The community was named for the German American Klaas family of pioneer settlers.

Geography

References

Unincorporated communities in Lake County, Indiana
Unincorporated communities in Indiana